Transient hepatic attenuation differences (THAD) are areas of enhancement during the arterial phase of contrast CT of the liver. THAD is thought to be a physiological phenomenon resulting from regional variation in the blood supply by the portal vein and/or the hepatic artery. THAD may in some cases be associated with liver tumors such as a hepatocellular carcinoma.

References

Hepatology
Radiology
Medical imaging